The Hobart Bridge was a floating arch bridge that crossed the River Derwent, connecting the eastern and western shores of the city of Hobart, Tasmania, Australia.

History 
Plans for a bridge to link the Derwent River’s two shores near Hobart date back to 1832. It was not until 1943 that the first bridge was completed, the Hobart floating bridge and lift span. The bridge was opened to toll traffic on 22 December 1943 and the collection of tolls continued until midnight on 31 December 1948.

Soon after its opening a violent storm blew in and damaged a section of the bridge, and to prevent the same happening again, the bridge was anchored to the riverbed in the middle and strengthening cables were added to stiffen the structure. After these modifications were completed the lifespan of the bridge was estimated as 21 years. It was closed on the 17 August 1964.

The bridge provided much better connection between the eastern and western shores, and consequently development on the eastern shore sped up and became so dense by the mid-1950s that the floating bridge could no longer handle the amount of traffic that was crossing it. Congestion became a severe problem, and in the late 1950s the decision was taken to construct a completely new bridge, the Tasman Bridge, which opened in August 1964.

The floating bridge was closed to traffic on 17 August of that year, and the following day the locking pin was removed and the two concrete sections towed away. For several years they were moored, but one of them sank in November 1970, and the Council undertook to dispose of them. The two halves were cut up and sunk at various locations.

The lift span was left in situ for some years but in the end it too was demolished. Today the only reminders of the bridge are the eastern foot of the lifting section which is still in place, and the preserved locking pin.

Construction 
The Hobart Bridge was of unique design and construction, and the first of its type anywhere in the world. It was a floating bridge with a lift span, constructed of hollow concrete pontoons, 24 in all, connected together forming a crescent shape curved upstream, and anchored in the middle.

The bridge was constructed in 12-pontoon sections which were then towed out into the river and connected to the banks and to each other in the middle. The two halves of the bridge were made of ten  pontoons, one  section, and one  section, joined in the middle by a  vertical locking pin, which was saved when the bridge was demolished and is now on display outside the Royal Engineers Building in Hobart.

It had a two-lane roadway and a footpath on one side. At the western end a large lifting section was provided to allow ships to pass. Four  electric motors were used to open the bridge, which took two minutes.

Engineering heritage award 
The bridge received an Engineering Heritage National Marker from Engineers Australia as part of its Engineering Heritage Recognition Program.

See also 

 List of bridges in Australia

Gallery

References 

 Parliament of Tasmania History site - Hobart to Tasman Bridge

Bridges in Hobart
Bridges completed in 1943
Demolished buildings and structures in Hobart
Pontoon bridges
Vertical lift bridges in Australia
History of Hobart
Former toll bridges in Australia
Road bridges in Tasmania
1943 establishments in Australia
1964 disestablishments in Australia
Recipients of Engineers Australia engineering heritage markers